Kenneth Desmond Rowe (19 November 1925 – 12 May 2007) was an Australian rules footballer who played in the Victorian Football League (VFL) between 1946 and 1957 for the Richmond Football Club. He was later senior coach of Richmond from 1961 to 1963.

Family
The son of Collingwood player Percy Rowe (1896–1976), and Catherine Isobel Rowe (1899–1981), née Smith,  Kenneth Desmond Rowe was born on 19 November 1925.

Football
After a successful season with Coburg (where his father was the coach) in 1945, Rowe crossed to Richmond where he became one of the finest half backs in the VFL. A regular player for Victoria, Rowe earned All Australian selection at the 1956 Perth carnival. Rowe was made Richmond captain in 1952, a position he held until the end of his senior playing career.

Notes

References 
 Hogan, P: The Tigers of Old: A Complete History of Every Player to Represent the Richmond Football Club between 1908 and 1996, Richmond FC, (Melbourne), 1996.

External links

Des Rowe's playing statistics from The VFA Project
Rowe a true Tiger great – Richmond in mourning
Richmond Football Club – Hall of Fame

Coburg Football Club players
Richmond Football Club players
Richmond Football Club coaches
Jack Dyer Medal winners
All-Australians (1953–1988)
1925 births
2007 deaths
Australian rules footballers from Victoria (Australia)